Maayan Sheleff is an independent art curator and artist based in Tel Aviv, Israel. Her projects explore social and political issues through participatory practices, at the intersection of art and technology.

Biography 
Sheleff was raised in Kiryat Ono, Israel. She studied plastic arts at the Thelma Yellin High School of Arts, Givatayim. Sheleff graduated Bezalel Academy of Arts and Design with a B.Des in industrial design, also studying at the Rhode Island School of Design and Politecnico di Milano. She later pursued postgraduate studies at the Interdisciplinary Arts Program, Tel Aviv University. She is currently studying towards a PhD at the Curatorial Platform in Zurich University of the Arts (ZHdK) and Reading University, UK.
Sheleff has been regularly teaching at the Bezalel Academy of Arts and Design, department of photography, the International Curatorial Studies Program of the Kibbutzim College, Tel Aviv, at the Sam Spiegel Film and Television School, Jerusalem and at Sapir Academic College, Sderot. She has been a guest lecturer in many institutions such as HaMidrasha – Faculty of the Arts, and the Technion – Israel Institute of Technology's Division of Continuing Education and External Studies curating program.

Curatorial positions 
 2014– Artistic Advisor and chair of artistic committee at the Art Cube Artists' Studios, Jerusalem and curator of its international residency program, LowRes Jerusalem
 2009–2012 – Curator at the Center for Contemporary Art, Tel Aviv
 2009–2012 – Assistant Director at the International Curatorial Studies Program of the Kibbutzim College and the CCA Tel Aviv
 2006–2009 – Director and chief curator of Line 16, a public gallery for contemporary art

Awards, grants and residencies 
 2015 – International Curatorial Retreat, organized by Vessel/Mada, Bari, Italy
 2014 – Residency Unlimited, NYC
 2014 – Quartier 21, Vienna, invited by Paraflows Festival for Digital Art
 2012 – Truth is Concrete, Steirischer Herbst Festival, Graz, Austria
 2012–2013 – Artport residency, Tel Aviv
 2012 – Artis grant recipient
 2012 – International Studio & Curatorial Program (ISCP) Curator Award
 2010 – Independent Curators International (ICI) Curatorial Intensive, New York City
 2010 – Artis grant recipient

Selected exhibitions 
 2017 – Poland ↔ Israel, Museum of Contemporary Art in Kraków (co-curated with Agnieszka Sachar, in collaboration with Miri Segal)
 2015 – Preaching to the Choir, Herzliya Museum of Contemporary Art
 2014 – The Infiltrators, Artport Tel Aviv
 2013 – The Promised Land, The Tokyo Metropolitan Museum of Photography, Tokyo, Japan
 2012 – Other Lives, Bloomfield Science Museum, Jerusalem, a new-media exhibition inspired by scientist Allan Turing
 2012 – Secondary Witness, International Studio & Curatorial Program, Brooklyn, New York City
 2012 – Connected, An Exhibition About Girls and the Internet, Bat Yam Promenade
 2012 – Prolonged Exposure, The Center for Contemporary Art (CCA), Tel Aviv
 2009–2010 – Co-curator, Transit project, cooperation between The Center for Contemporary Art (CCA), Tel Aviv and MADRE, Naples, Italy
 2009 – Co-curator, ARTLV – the 1st Tel Aviv-Yafo Biennial

Selected publications 

 2022 – InConcrete Stones, participating artists: Hannan Abu-Hussein, Nikolaus Eckhard, Avner Pinchover, Christoph Weber, Arkadi Zaides, Art Cube Artists' Studios, Jerusalem
 2021 – M/otherland, Ruth Patir & Maayan Sheleff, OnCurating, Zurich. 
 2019 – (Un)Commoning Voices and (Non)Communal Bodies, Maayan Sheleff & Sarah Spies (Eds.), OnCurating, Zurich. 
 2019 – Grand Kenyon, participating artists: Ronit Porat, Guy Konigstein, Art Cube Artists' Studios, Jerusalem. 
 2018 – Rendering Borders, participating artists: Morehshin Allahyari, Lior Zalmanson, Art Cube Artists' Studios, Jerusalem. 
 2017 – Fear and Love in Graz: Steirischer Herbst’s Truth Is Concrete (2012), in Empty Stages, Crowded Flats – Performativity as Curatorial Strategy – Performing Urgency #4, Florian Malzacher and Janna Warsza (Eds.), Alexander Verlag, Berlin 
 2017 – "Jerusalem of Gold" vs. "The Yelllow Fleet" & "The Day When Nothing Happened", Art Cube Artists' Studios, Jerusalem. 
 2017 – 50 Years, B'Tselem
 2016 – »The Infiltrators« – Crossing Borders with Participatory Art, in Geflüchtete und Kulturelle Bildung Formate und Konzepte für ein neues Praxisfeld, Maren Ziese & Caroline Gritschke (Ed.), Transcript Verlag, Bielefeld. 
 2016 – The Chosen People - A Small Guide For a Big Revolution, a conversation with Andy Bichlbaum from The Yes Men, Tohu online magazine 
 2014 – The Infiltrators, Artport Tel Aviv
 2012 – Secondary Witness, International Studio & Curatorial Program (ISCP). 
 2012 – World Order, Dana Levy, Braverman Gallery and CCA Tel Aviv.

External links
Maayan Sheleff at the Independent Curators International website
 Frankie the Documentation Robot website, a project by Maayan Sheleff, Gal Eshel and Eran Hadas

Further reading 
 The Infiltrators: Crossing borders with participatory art by Maayan Sheleff in: Gritschke, Caroline, and Maren Ziese. 2016. Geflüchtete und kulturelle Bildung Formate und Konzepte für ein neues Praxisfeld. Pp 123–130. Bielefeld: transcript. 
 Fear and Love in Graz by Maayan Sheleff in: Florian Malzacher and Janna Warsza (ed.), 2017. Empty Stages, Crowded Flats. Performativity as Curatorial Strategy, Performing Urgency No. 4, Berlin: House on Fire, Live Art Development Agency & Alexander Verlag.

References

Living people
Israeli artists
Israeli art curators
Thelma Yellin High School of Arts alumni
Bezalel Academy of Arts and Design alumni
Year of birth missing (living people)
Israeli women artists
Israeli women curators